The Hebrew Hammer is a 2003 American comedy film written and directed by Jonathan Kesselman. It stars Adam Goldberg, Judy Greer, Andy Dick, Mario Van Peebles, and Peter Coyote. The plot concerns a Jewish blaxploitation crime fighter known as the Hebrew Hammer who must save Hanukkah from the evil son of Santa Claus, who wants to destroy Hanukkah and Kwanzaa and make everyone celebrate Christmas.

The film parodies blaxploitation films, and features Melvin Van Peebles in a cameo as "Sweetback".

Plot
The film begins with a flashback to a young Mordechai Jefferson Carver. At school, Mordechai is tormented by his fellow students and his teacher for being a Jewish child in a public school predominantly attended by Christians, and for celebrating Hanukkah while everyone else celebrates Christmas. He feels further alienated as he walks through his neighborhood and sees a seemingly endless number of Christmas decorations and window displays celebrating the holiday and announcing that Jews aren't welcome. As he lies down on the sidewalk in front of a store saying "Jews 'OK' (for about 5 minutes)" and spins his dreidel to cheer himself up, Santa Claus walks by and crushes the toy under his foot, then gives Mordechai the finger.

The scene then changes to the present with Mordechai as the Hebrew Hammer, a certified circumcised "dick" who has dedicated his life to defending Jews. His snappy dress (a cross between that of a pimp and a Hasidic Jew) and tough-guy demeanor have made him a local hero within the Jewish community. Jews and African-Americans have enjoyed a tenuous peace with the White Christians over the previous few decades because the current Santa (the son of the cruel Santa who stomped Mordechai's dreidel years earlier) has pursued a policy of inclusion and tolerance.  This Santa is murdered and replaced by his son, Damian, who seeks to destroy Hanukkah and Kwanzaa thus reserving December for Christmas alone. Mordechai is reluctantly recruited to stop Damian, gaining allies along the way, including love interest and daughter of the Chief of the Jewish Justice League Esther Bloomenbergensteinenthal and the Kwanzaa Liberation Front's leader Mohammed Ali Paula Abdul Rahim.

The fight takes them to exotic locales such as Israel, K-Mart, the Jewish Atomic Clock outside Jerusalem and the final battle at the North Pole.

Cast
 Adam Goldberg as Mordechai Jefferson Carver / The Hebrew Hammer
 Grant Rosenmeyer as young Mordechai
 Judy Greer as Esther Bloomenbergensteinenthal
 Andy Dick as Damian Claus
 Mario Van Peebles as Mohammed Ali Paula Abdul Rahim
 Peter Coyote as Jewish Justice League Chief Bloomenbergensteinenthal
 Nora Dunn as Mrs. Carver
 Sean Whalen as Tiny Tim
 Tony Cox as Jamal
 Richard Riehle as Santa
 Melvin Van Peebles as Sweetback
 Rachel Dratch as Tikva
 Harrison Chad as Schlomo
 Annie McEnroe as Mrs. Highsmith
 Elaine Hendrix as Blonde bombshell
 Ed Koch as himself
 Jimmy Walsh as Freckle-Faced Gentile
 Jason Fuchs as Adolescent Hasidic Boy

Controversy
The Hebrew Hammer parodies many common stereotypes about Jews. During filming, the movie came to the attention of the Anti-Defamation League, which were concerned that it might promote unfavorable images of Jews; the film happens to include a direct parody of the ADL as members of the fictional Jewish Justice League. After viewing the film, Warren Katz of the ADL brought legal action against the producers of the film but lost in a summary ruling handed down by the United States District Court for the Northern District of New York. The film also drew criticism from some Christian groups, who argued that the film portrayed most Christians as being anti-Semitic and intolerant.

Many scenes were shot in Borough Park, Brooklyn, which has a large community of Hasidic Jews. Filmmakers were initially concerned that members of the Hasidic community might protest the movie, as they did with the 1998 film A Price Above Rubies, and shut down filming. The reaction of the Hasidim in Borough Park was mixed, however. No organized protest was pursued, and some residents of the neighborhood agreed to appear as extras in the film.

Reception
The film received a rating of 52% on aggregate review site Rotten Tomatoes.

Sequel
In 2017, plans for a sequel titled The Hebrew Hammer Vs. Hitler were announced. The sequel will be funded in part by crowd funding. It will begin in the present day, with the Hammer coming out of retirement to fight the increase in racism brought on by Donald Trump's election. He does this by going back in time to fight the worst source of antisemitism in the 20th century.

See also
 Santa Claus in film

References

External links
 
 
 
 
 
 

2003 films
American Christmas films
Comedy Central films
Films about Jews and Judaism
Films about race and ethnicity
Films set in Israel
Films set in New York City
Films shot in New York City
Hanukkah films
Jewish comedy and humor
Santa Claus in television
Religious comedy films
American action comedy films
2000s action comedy films
American vigilante films
American parody films
2000s parody films
2000s vigilante films
American exploitation films
2003 comedy films
2000s English-language films
2000s American films
Santa Claus in film